Passing Ends is a five-track EP from New Jersey-based rock band Man Overboard which was released on October 27, 2014 through Rude Records.

Track listing

Personnel
Zac Eisenstein — lead vocals, rhythm guitar, piano
Nik Bruzzese — lead vocals, bass guitar
Wayne Wildrick — lead guitar, backing vocals
Justin Collier — rhythm guitar, backing vocals
Joe Talarico — drums

References

External links

Passing Ends at YouTube (streamed copy where licensed)

2014 EPs
Man Overboard (band) EPs